The 1926 Canton Bulldogs season was their sixth and final season in the league. The team failed to improve on their previous output of 4–4, winning only one game. They finished twentieth in the league.

Schedule

Standings

References

Canton Bulldogs seasons
Canton Bulldogs
Canton Bulldogs